Dennis John Gearin (October 15, 1897 – March 11, 1959) was a former Major League Baseball pitcher. He played two seasons with the New York Giants (1923–1924) and Boston Braves (1924).

References

External links

Boston Braves players
New York Giants (NL) players
Major League Baseball pitchers
Providence Grays (minor league) players
Oakland Oaks (baseball) players
Milwaukee Brewers (minor league) players
Rochester Red Wings players
Baseball players from Providence, Rhode Island
1897 births
1959 deaths